Liga Deportiva Universitaria de Quito's 1980 season was the club's 50th year of existence, the 27th year in professional football, the 20th in the top level of professional football in Ecuador.

Kits
Sponsor(s): Kodak, Ecuacolor

Competitions

Serie A

First stage

Results

Second stage

Results

References
RSSSF - 1980 Serie A

External links
Official Site

1980